The following lists events that happened during 1992 in Zaire.

Incumbents 
 President: Mobutu Sese Seko
 Prime Minister: Jean Nguza Karl-i-Bond, then Étienne Tshisekedi

Events

Births 

 28 August - Bismack Biyombo, basketball player

See also

 Zaire
 History of the Democratic Republic of the Congo

References

Sources

 
Zaire
Zaire